Shaun Rogers (born July 22, 1985) is an American former competitive figure skater. He won silver medals at the 2007 Nebelhorn Trophy and 2008 Finlandia Trophy, two medals on the ISU Junior Grand Prix series, and placed eighth at the 2005 World Junior Championships. 

In 2005, Rogers was coached by Pam Gregory and Ronald Ludington at the University of Delaware Figure Skating Club. Later in his career, he was coached by Priscilla Hill and Anne Militano at the Skating Club of Wilmington. After retiring from competition, he joined Royal Caribbean Cruise Lines, performing in their ice shows.

Programs

Competitive highlights

References

External links

 
 Official site

American male single skaters
1985 births
Living people
Sportspeople from Baltimore